This is a list of the governors of the province of Nangarhar, Afghanistan.

Governors of Nangarhar Province

See also
 List of Afghanistan governors

Notes

Nangarhar